Tymień  (German: Timmenhagen) is a village in the administrative district of Gmina Będzino, within Koszalin County, West Pomeranian Voivodeship, in north-western Poland.

At Tymień, there is a large wind park with 25 wind turbines.

The village has a population of 950.

References

Villages in Koszalin County